Summer Games is a 1984 Italian teen comedy film written and directed by Bruno Cortini.

Plot   

In Porto Rotondo the stories of love and jealousy of a group of young people follow one another, including boat trips, beach games and parties in the villas and clubs of the Costa Smeralda.

Cast
 Massimo Ciavarro: Brando
 Natasha Hovey: Ale Donelli 
 Mauro Di Francesco: Gianni Perego
 Corinne Cléry: Lisa Donelli
 Karina Huff: Ambra Carimati 
 Fabio Testi: Roberto Ripa 
 Lidia Broccolino: Zaccaria,  Zac
 Valeria Cavalli: Teodora Theodoli, a.k.a. Teo 
 Andrea Prodan: The Marquis 
 Guido Nicheli: Gino Carimati, a.k.a. Nogi  
 Odoacre Chierico: Himself
 Francesco Graziani: Himself

See also        
 List of Italian films of 1984

References

External links
 

1984 films
Italian black comedy films
1980s Italian-language films
1980s black comedy films
Films set in Sardinia
1984 comedy films
1980s Italian films